Brian David Mason  (born October 12, 1953) is a Canadian politician who was leader of the Alberta New Democratic Party from 2004 to 2014 and served the Minister of Transportation in Rachel Notley's NDP government. He also served as the Government House Leader. Mason was first elected as a Member of the Legislative Assembly of Alberta for the now-defunct riding of Edmonton Highlands in a 2000 byelection. He was subsequently re-elected, and was elected in Edmonton-Highlands-Norwood after the riding was created in 2004. He chose not to seek re-election in 2019, and was succeeded by Janis Irwin. Mason was the longest serving NDP MLA in Alberta history, with a political career spanning more than 20 years.

Early political involvement
Mason was born in Calgary in 1953, the son of an electrical engineer. His father was a Red Tory who later helped found the Reform Party of Canada while his mother was a Liberal.

Mason first became politically active in the mid-1970s while studying political science at the University of Alberta. He served as executive director of the Federation of Alberta Students from 1977 to 1979. While there he boarded at the traditionally Tory fraternity Phi Gamma Delta and was roommates with future Progressive Conservative Premier Dave Hancock, who teased him by calling him a communist. Upon leaving university Mason began working as bus driver with the Edmonton Transit Service.

Municipal politics
Mason first ran for Edmonton city council after he was temporarily laid off from ETS in 1983, before becoming president of the Edmonton Voters Association, a municipal political party. He tried again for a seat on the council in 1989 with a dynamic campaign running in Ward 3. Mason's campaign came with a legal challenge he mounted against a provincial law forbidding municipal employees from running as candidates in a civic election unless they resigned their position with the city.

The legal challenge was unsuccessful, however Mason was elected city councillor for Ward 3 in October 1989. Shortly after the election the law Mason challenged was repealed, and municipal workers in Edmonton were subsequently allowed to run for civic office without resigning their positions. Mason remained on city council until 2000, when he ran for political office for the New Democratic Party.

Provincial politics
In 2000, following the mid-term resignation of then leader of the Alberta New Democrats and MLA for Edmonton Highlands Pam Barrett, Mason left city council and ran for the NDP in the ensuing by-election. He held the Legislative Assembly seat with a strong majority, and was re-elected in the 2001 provincial election.

Alberta NDP Leader 
Mason was appointed the role of interim party leader for the NDP following the resignation of then leader Raj Pannu in July 2004. He became the official leader of Alberta's NDP on September 18, 2004, following a vote at the party convention.

Mason held his seat during the provincial election in 2004, which saw the caucus welcome the return of former leaders Pannu and Ray Martin, along with newcomer David Eggen. In the provincial election of 2008 Mason again retained his seat, and was joined in caucus by newly elected NDP MLA  Rachel Notley from Edmonton-Strathcona, the seat previously held by Pannu.

Mason also hosted various community meetings across the province. In 2009, Mason hosted a Round Table forum to discuss provincial budget concerns with a wide cross-section of Albertans. In 2009 and 2010, Mason hosted two provincial tours, each visiting several Alberta communities. The first tour took place in September 2009, with the public forums focusing on health care concerns, and resulted in the publication of the What People Want report. This report included more than 35 recommendations for health care reforms. The second tour took place in May 2010, where the NDP again held public consultations. This time, participants were invited to discuss concerns over the future of Alberta's energy economy and environment, as well as the erosion of public health services including long-term care.

In the 2012 provincial election the NDP picked up two seats in Edmonton, regaining their previous four seat total. Both Notley and Mason safely held onto their seats while David Eggen was re-elected as the member for Edmonton-Calder. Newcomer Deron Bilous was also elected in Edmonton-Beverly-Clareview, the seat formerly held by Martin. In many other ridings the party also won more votes than it had attained previously.

On April 29, 2014, Brian Mason announced that he would step down as leader as soon as a leadership election could be held to choose his successor. Mason who had mentored Rachel Notley convinced her to run for the leadership which she won. During the final few months of Mason's tenure the party was already enjoying strong polling in Edmonton, something which would eventually grow into the larger electoral sweep that the Alberta NDP managed in the 2015 provincial election under Mason's successor Notley that resulted in the formation of Alberta's first ever NDP government.

Member of Notley cabinet 
On May 24, 2015, Mason was appointed Minister of Infrastructure and Minister of Transportation, as well as Government House Leader.

Mason announced on July 4, 2018 that he would not seek re-election in the 2019 provincial election. He remained as a minister until April 30, 2019, when the new United Conservative Party government of Jason Kenney was sworn in.

Edmonton provincial election riding results, 2000 to 2015

2000 by-election

2001 general election

2004 general election

2008 general election

2012 general election

2015 general election

References

External links

 Alberta NDP Opposition homepage (caucus)
 Alberta NDP homepage (party)
 Party info about Brian Mason
 

1953 births
Living people
Alberta CCF/NDP leaders
Alberta New Democratic Party MLAs
Canadian people of Scottish descent
Members of the Executive Council of Alberta
Politicians from Calgary
21st-century Canadian politicians
Bus drivers